Plasmodium loveridgei is a parasite of the genus Plasmodium subgenus Lacertamoeba. 

Like all Plasmodium species P. loveridgei has both vertebrate and insect hosts. The vertebrate hosts for this parasite are reptiles.

Description 

The parasite was first described by Telford in 1984.

Young schizonts elongate and narrow with acuminate ends.  Mature schizonts are polymorphic, are usually larger than host cell nuclei, and give rise to 6-26 merozoites.

Immature gametocytes like young schizonts are elongate and narrow, with acuminate ends. Mature gametocytes are elongate averaging 3 times the host cell nucleus size and have dispersed pigment.

Geographical occurrence 

This species is found in the Uluguru Mountains, Tanzania.

Clinical features and host pathology 

This species infects the lizard Lygodactylus picturatus.

References 

loveridgei